The Armstrong Siddeley Mamba was a British turboprop engine produced by Armstrong Siddeley in the late 1940s and 1950s, producing around 1,500 effective horsepower (1,100 kW).

Armstrong Siddeley gas turbine engines were named after snakes.

Design and development
The Mamba was a compact engine  with a 10-stage axial compressor, six combustion chambers and a two-stage power turbine. The epicyclic reduction gearbox was incorporated in the propeller spinner. Engine starting was by cartridge. The Ministry of Supply designation was ASMa (Armstrong Siddeley Mamba). The ASMa.3 gave 1,475 ehp and the ASMa.6 was rated at 1,770 ehp. A 500-hour test was undertaken in 1948 and the Mamba was the first turboprop engine to power the Douglas DC-3, when in 1949, a Dakota testbed was converted to take two Mambas.

The Mamba was also developed into the form of the Double Mamba, which was used to power the Fairey Gannet anti-submarine aircraft for the Royal Navy. This was essentially two Mambas lying side-by-side and driving contra-rotating propellers separately through a common gearbox.

A turbojet version of the Mamba was developed as the Armstrong Siddeley Adder, by removing the reduction gearbox.

Variants and applications

ASMa.3 Mamba
Armstrong Whitworth Apollo
Avro Athena
Boulton Paul Balliol
Breguet Vultur
Miles M.69 Marathon II
Douglas C-47 Dakota
Short SB.3
ASMa.5 MambaDevelopment engine for Armstrong Siddeley ASMD.3 Double Mamba
ASMa.6 Mamba
Short Seamew
ASMa.7 MambaA version for civil applications
Swiss-Mamba SM-1 (aft turbofan variant)
EFW N-20
Mamba 112 (ASMa.6)

Engines on display
An Armstrong Siddeley Mamba is on static display at the Midland Air Museum, Coventry Airport, Warwickshire, at the Royal Air Force Museum Cosford and at the East Midlands Aeropark.

A Mamba is also on display at the Aviation Heritage Museum (Western Australia).

A Swiss-Mamba SM-1 is on display at the Flieger-Flab-Museum Dübendorf.

A Mamba is also on display at the Hertha Ayrton STEM Centre, Sheffield Hallam University, UK.

Specifications (ASMa.6)

See also

References

Bibliography

External links

1940s turboprop engines
Mamba
Axial-compressor gas turbine engines